Khan Investment Management is an investment management and advisory group that operates a  fund investing in  Mongolia related equities.   The firm was founded by Travis Hamilton in March 2011, and is based in Singapore and the Cayman Islands.

History
Founder Travis Hamilton has said he was inspired by a discussion in 2006 with Robert Friedland, the CEO of Ivanhoe Mines, a Canadian company operating in Mongolia. In 2010, Hamilton left his position at the Helvetica group to explore opportunities in Mongolia. When he found no easy way for outside investment in this market, he decided to launch a fund.

In November 2011, Khan Investment Management launched the Khan Mongolia Equity Fund, the first open-ended investment fund investing both in companies listed on the Mongolian Stock Exchange and in companies that operate in Mongolia but are listed  elsewhere. The fund also participates in Mongolian initial public offerings. In March 2012, Narantuguldur Saijrakh, former General Manager of Asia Pacific Securities, became a full-time director.

References

External links
Khan Investment Management website

Investment companies of Singapore
Ulaanbaatar
Economy of Mongolia
Singaporean companies established in 2011
Financial services companies established in 2011